Chengbei Subdistrict is a subdistrict of Hecheng District, in the north of Huaihua, Hunan, People's Republic of China. , it has seven residential communities under its administration.

References

Subdistricts of Hunan
Hecheng District